The Socialist Labor Party was a political party in Canada that was formed in 1898 by Canadian supporters of the ideas of American socialist Daniel De Leon and the Socialist Labor Party of America. It became a national party in the 1930s and had its headquarters in Toronto. The party never won any seats.  The party ran only a small number of candidates (listed below), all of whom placed last in their respective elections.

The party dissolved in 2005 following the accidental death of its national secretary, Doug Irving.

Federal election results

British Columbia provincial election results
The party also unsuccessfully contested three provincial elections in British Columbia:

See also
 List of political parties in Canada
 List of Canadian socialist parties
Socialism in Canada

Footnotes

Federal political parties in Canada
De Leonist organizations
1898 establishments in British Columbia
Political parties established in 1898
Political parties disestablished in 2005
2005 disestablishments in Canada